Long Season (stylized in all caps; subtitled ...we are not four seasons) is the sixth studio album by Japanese dub group Fishmans. It was first released on October 25, 1996 in Japan by Polydor Records. It was recorded in July 1996 and consists of a single 35-minute composition based on the band's earlier song "Season". The album was released to modest success in the Japanese alternative scene, but was scarcely known outside Japan until the 2010s, and has since garnered critical acclaim and online media attention. Fishmans performed the entire Long Season album as one piece during their final live shows in December 1998, a recording of which was included on the album 98.12.28 男達の別れ.

Background
The idea for Long Season developed from a chat between the members of Fishmans. They wanted to create a one-song album instead of a standard track-by-track album like their previous efforts. Several recording sessions were held, with the band composing the album's sole song "Long Season" by building upon their earlier song "Season", which had been released as a single in 1996. Fishmans and co-producer ZAK developed ideas for the album at their studio Waikiki Beach and made detailed edits. There were episodes in which ZAK would "shed blood from his eyes" from viewing computer monitors for too long.

Fishmans invited a number of guest musicians to assist in the recording of Long Season. The band were again joined by frequent collaborator Honzi (keyboards, violin), as well as J-pop singer MariMari, whom Fishmans would frequently perform alongside in the years following the album's release. Long Season would also be the first Fishmans album to feature Michio "Darts" Sekiguchi as a guest guitarist. He would go on to play with the band until their final concert. Singer UA contributed vocals to the album.

Track listing
The album consists of one 35-minute-long composition, which has been split up into five parts on multiple issues.

Personnel
Credits adapted from the album's liner notes.

Fishmans – production, arrangement
Shinji Sato – vocal, guitar, lyrics, composition
Yuzuru Kashiwabara – bass
Kin-ichi Motegi – drums
Honzi – keyboards, violin, accordion, Organette20, chorus
Michio "Darts" Sekiguchi – guitar, chorus
Asa-Chang – percussion
Taito Sato – guitar
UA – chorus
MariMari – chorus
Masaki Morimoto – whistle
Butchy – chorus
Naoko Ohmiya – chorus
Yoshiko Ohmiya – chorus
ZAK – production, programming, recording, mixing
TAK – recording
Yuka Koizumi – mastering
Toshiya Sano – artists and repertoire
Naoko Nozawa – artist promotion
Katsuyoshi Kinase – marketing promotion
Akiko Ueta – artist management
Ichiro Asatsuma – executive producer
Yoshiyuki Okuda – executive producer
Tadataka Watanabe – executive producer
Phonic (Mooog & Mariko Yamamoto) – art direction, design
Ayako Mogi – photography
Crion Yamamoto – photography
Junko Ishiwata – styling

Charts

2016 reissue

References

Fishmans albums
1996 albums